Antonio Gallina (born 30 November 1947) is an Argentine judoka. He competed in the men's middleweight event at the 1972 Summer Olympics.

References

1947 births
Living people
Argentine male judoka
Olympic judoka of Argentina
Judoka at the 1972 Summer Olympics
Place of birth missing (living people)
20th-century Argentine people